Edhonveli Thundi is a 2007 Maldivian two-part horror short-film written and directed by Yoosuf Shafeeu. Co-produced by Shafeeu and Hassan Adam under Eupe Production, the film stars Shafeeu, Ali Riyaz and Fathimath Fareela in pivotal roles.

Premise

Part one
Ali (Ali Riyaz), a naturalist and the helpless younger brother of a blind man, Yoosuf Shafeeu spends most of his time at the beach, enjoying the nature. One day, he finds a beautiful shell near the seashore and equates himself with the shell for its "dead nature". He further confesses that if the shell has any element alive in it, he is desperate to marry the shell even, unbeknownst to him that a spirit is residing in the shell. The following day he wakes up to a female sobbing sound which was echoed again through the same shell, that evening. Followed by the curiosity, he brings the shell to his home. The voice, who believes to be married to Ali, communicates to him and begs to help her.

Part two
On the fourteenth night of an ecclesiastical lunar month, Ali witnesses the real form of the woman (Fathimath Fareela) trapped in the shell. Astonished by her beauty, Ali promises to help her and seeks help from an exorcist, Hussain (Ahmed Shahid). His rescue mission takes an unexpected turn when Ali discovers the involvement of his brother.

Cast 
 Yoosuf Shafeeu as Ali's brother
 Ali Riyaz as Ali
 Fathimath Fareela
 Mariyam Shahuza as Shahu
 Moosa Nazeem as Moosa
 Ahmed Shahid as Hussain
 Azhar
 Saalim as Jameel

Soundtrack

Accolades

References

Maldivian short films
2007 short films
2007 films
2007 horror films
2008 horror films
Films directed by Yoosuf Shafeeu